Solariella chani is a species of sea snail, a marine gastropod mollusk in the family Solariellidae.

Description

Distribution
This marine species occurs off Indonesia and Taiwan.

References

External links

chani
Gastropods described in 2009